is a Japanese professional shogi player ranked 9-dan. He is a former Ōza title holder and the inventor of the influential Tsukada Special strategy, which he used to win numerous games in the 1980s, is named after him.

Early life
Tsukada was born in Tokyo Metropolis on November 16, 1964.

Shogi professional
Tsukada is a member of the so-called Shōwa 55 group (55年組), a group of eight strong players that become professional in 1980–1981 (Year 55 of the Shōwa period) and won numerous shogi tournaments.

Promotion history
The promotion history for Tsukada is as follows:
 4-kyū: 1978
 1-dan: 1979
 4-dan: March 5, 1981
 5-dan: April 1, 1983
 6-dan: April 1, 1986
 7-dan: April 1, 1987
 8-dan: April 1, 1988
 9-dan: December 15, 2000

Titles and other championships
Tsukada has appeared in major title matches twice. He won the 35th Ōza in 1987 for his only major title.

Awards and honors
Tsukada has received a number awards and honors throughout his career for his accomplishments both on an off the shogi board. These include awards given out annually by the JSA for performance in official games as well as other awards for achievement.

Annual Shogi Awards
13th Annual Awards (April 1985March 1986): Technique Award
14th Annual Awards (April 1986March 1987): Most Consecutive Games Won, Technique Award
15th Annual Awards (April 1987March 1988): Technique Award 
42nd Annual Awards (April 2014March 2015): Kōzō Masuda Special Award

Other awards
2005: 25 Years Service Award (Awarded by the JSA in recognition of being an active professional for twenty-five years)
2008: Shogi Honor Award (Awarded by the JSA in recognition of winning 600 official games as a professional)

Personal life
Tsukada is married to retired woman's shogi professional Sachiko Takamure. The couple's eldest daughter Erika is also a female shogi professional.

References

External links
ShogiHub: Professional Player Info · Tsukada, Yasuaki

1964 births
Japanese shogi players
Living people
Professional shogi players
Professional shogi players from Tokyo Metropolis
Ōza (shogi)
Recipients of the Kōzō Masuda Award
Shinjin-Ō